Charles William Hellaby is an associate professor of applied mathematics at the University of Cape Town, South Africa, working in the field of cosmology. He is a member of the International Astronomical Union and a member of the Baháʼí Faith.

Life 
Hellaby was born to Rev. William Allen Meldrum Hellaby and Emily Madeline Hellaby. His twin brother, Mark Edwin Hellaby, pursued a career in literature while his younger brother, Julian Meldrum Hellaby, took to music as a career. He obtained a BSc (Physics & Astronomy) at the University of St Andrews, Scotland in 1977. He completed his MSc (Relativity) at Queen's University, Kingston, Ontario in 1981 and his PhD (Relativity) at Queen's University in 1985.

From 1985 to 1988 he was a Post Doctoral Researcher at the University of Cape Town under George Ellis. In 1989 he was appointed a lecturer at the University of Cape Town.

Hellaby is a member of the International Astronomical Union (Division J Galaxies and Cosmology), having previously been a member of Division VIII Galaxies & the Universe and subsequently Commission 47 Cosmology.

Research 
His research interests include:

 Inhomogeneous cosmology.  Standard cosmology assumes a smooth homogeneous universe, but the real universe is very lumpy
 Inhomogeneous cosmological models - their evolution, geometry and singularities
 Non-linear structure formation in the universe
 Extracting the geometry of the cosmos from observations
 The Lemaitre–Tolman cosmological model
 The Szekeres cosmological model
 Junction conditions in GR
 Dense black holes
 Local inhomogeneities and the Swiss cheese model

He has also worked on
 The models of Vaidya, Schwarzschild–Kruskal–Szekeres & Kinnersley
 Classical signature change
 Cosmic strings
 Gravitational collapse

Hellaby co-authored Structures in the Universe by Exact Methods: Formation, Evolution, Interactions in which applications of inhomogenous solutions to Albert Einstein's field equations of cosmology are reviewed. The structure of galaxy clusters, galaxies with central black holes and supernovae dimming can be studied with the aid of inhomogenous models.

References

External links 

Academic staff of the University of Cape Town
21st-century South African physicists
Living people
Year of birth missing (living people)